The 2020 Categoría Primera A season  (officially known as the 2020 Liga BetPlay Dimayor season for sponsorship reasons) was the 73rd season of the Categoría Primera A, Colombia's top-flight football league. The season began on 23 January and concluded on 29 December 2020. América de Cali entered the season as defending champions having won the 2019 Finalización tournament, and managed to defend their title by beating Santa Fe 3–2 on aggregate in the finals, winning their fifteenth domestic league championship.

The competition was suspended from 13 March to 12 September due to the COVID-19 pandemic.

Format 
Prior to the COVID-19 pandemic, the league season was planned to be played as follows:

 Two tournaments per year, with three stages each. The first stage would be contested on a single round-robin basis, with each team playing the other teams once plus an additional match against a regional rival for a total of 20 games.
 Due to the 2020 Copa América scheduled to be held in the country from mid-June to mid-July, and in order to conclude the Torneo Apertura on 24 May, the second stage for this tournament would be a knockout round contested by the top four teams at the end of the first stage, with the best-placed team at the end of the first stage facing the fourth-best placed team and the second-best placed team playing the third-best placed one in a double-legged series. The Torneo Finalización would feature the semifinal stage as it was played during the previous season.
 The finals in both tournaments would be contested by the winners of each semifinal tie or group, playing a double-legged series for the championship.
 The distribution of international qualification berths as well as the relegation system would not change.

On 25 July 2020, DIMAYOR's General Assembly decided to continue playing the Torneo Apertura as the only tournament to be held in the season, with the semifinal stage originally planned for the Torneo Finalización. The allocation of international qualification berths was also altered, with the Copa Libertadores berth originally allocated to the Finalización winners going to the league runners-up, and the fourth Copa Sudamericana berth going to the winner of a play-off involving the aggregate table fourth best team not qualified for the Copa Libertadores and the 12 teams that fail to qualify for the semifinal stage. Further format changes were confirmed on 13 August 2020, with DIMAYOR's General Assembly deciding to suspend relegation for this season and postpone it until the end of the first semester of 2021, in order to ensure teams could be able to play the same amount of matches as originally scheduled before the onset of the COVID-19 pandemic.

On 9 September 2020, DIMAYOR confirmed the format to be used for the remainder of the season, with the single round-robin stage started in the Torneo Apertura being resumed and played as planned and eight teams advancing out of the first stage. The semifinal stage was ultimately replaced by double-legged knockout series to decide the league champions, whilst the 12 teams that failed to qualify for the knockout stage would be sorted into three groups of four teams, with the group winners and the best group runners-up advancing to a single-legged semifinal stage and the winners of those semifinals facing each other in a single-legged final, with its winner playing against the aggregate table fourth-best placed team not qualified for the 2021 Copa Libertadores for the Colombia 4 berth to the 2021 Copa Sudamericana.

Teams 
20 teams took part, eighteen of them returning from last season plus Deportivo Pereira and Boyacá Chicó, who were promoted from the 2019 Primera B. Both promoted teams replaced Unión Magdalena and Atlético Huila who were relegated at the end of the previous season by having finished as the bottom two teams of the relegation table.

Stadia and locations

Managerial changes

Effects of the COVID-19 pandemic
On 13 March 2020, after a meeting with its member clubs, DIMAYOR announced the temporary suspension of the tournament, along with the Primera B and Copa Colombia ones, due to the COVID-19 pandemic.

On 29 June, and after an Assembly of its member clubs, DIMAYOR presented a timetable for the implementation of the biosecurity protocol to resume its competitions, with COVID-19 testing for players and staff members of every club scheduled to be held from 10 to 15 July, and individual training resuming the following day. The resumption of collective training sessions, scheduled for 20 August, would be subject to government approval. According to said timetable, the league was scheduled to resume on 27 August, pending the fulfillment of the previous stages as well as final approval by the Colombian government. On 25 July, it was announced that the competition would resume on 30 August with alterations in its format, and pending government approval. With the Ministry of Health authorizing stages 4 and 5 of the biosecurity protocol (collective trainings and competition, respectively) on 20 August, and due to some adjustments to the protocol requested by DIMAYOR, that date of resumption had to be pushed back for at least two weeks, to mid-September.

On 31 August, the Ministry of Health issued the resolution that approved the adjusted protocol and greenlit the start of collective training sessions for 1 September, while President of DIMAYOR Fernando Jaramillo confirmed that the tournament would resume on 19 September, with the postponed matches  Deportivo Cali vs. Millonarios and Deportivo Pasto vs. Deportes Tolima to be played on 13 and 14 September, respectively. On 3 September, DIMAYOR confirmed that the league would resume on 12 September 2020, with the postponed matches as it was planned, while the rest of clubs were notified that the ninth round of the competition would be played in the weekend of 19–20 September, with a meeting to confirm the competition format to be held on 9 September.

On 18 September, the match Atlético Nacional vs. Deportes Tolima was suspended by DIMAYOR on advice from representatives from the Ministry of Health following the confirmation of positive COVID-19 cases in the latter team and despite having authorized the team's trip to Medellín to play the match. The match was scheduled to be played in the evening of that same day, and was eventually rescheduled for 30 September.

First stage

Standings

Results

Knockout stage

Bracket

Quarter-finals

|}

First leg

Second leg

Semi-finals

|}

First leg

Second leg

Finals

América de Cali won 3–2 on aggregate.

Liguilla

Group stage
The 12 teams that failed to qualify for the knockout stages were split into three groups of four teams according to geographical criteria and played each one of their rivals once in a single round-robin tournament, with the two highest-placed teams from the first stage in each group playing two matches at home. The three group winners and the best group runners-up advanced to the semi-finals.

The fixture for the Liguilla group stage was unveiled by DIMAYOR on 23 November. Due to the liquidation of Cúcuta Deportivo, DIMAYOR decided to exclude that club from the competition and the Liguilla was played by 11 teams as a result, with one of the groups being comprised by three teams only.

Group A

Group B

Group C

Ranking of group runners-up
The best team among the three group runners-up qualified for the Liguilla semi-finals.

Semi-finals
The teams with the best performance after the first stage and the Liguilla group stage hosted the match.

Final
The team with the best performance after the first stage and the previous stages of the Liguilla hosted the match.

Aggregate table

Copa Sudamericana play-off
The Liguilla winners played the aggregate table fourth best team not qualified for the 2021 Copa Libertadores in a single match for the Colombia 4 berth in the 2021 Copa Sudamericana. The match was hosted by the aggregate table fourth best team not qualified for the Copa Libertadores.

Top goalscorers
{| class="wikitable" border="1"
|-
! Rank
! Name
! Club
! Goals
|-
| align=center | 1
| Miguel Borja
|Junior
| align=center | 14
|-
| align=center | 2
| Jáder Obrian
|Rionegro Águilas
| align=center | 13
|-
| rowspan=3 align=center | 3
| Cristian Arango
|Millonarios
| rowspan=3 align=center | 10
|-
| Matías Mier
|La Equidad
|-
| Agustín Palavecino
|Deportivo Cali
|-
| rowspan=3 align=center | 6
| Jefferson Duque
|Atlético Nacional
| rowspan=3 align=center | 9
|-
| Diego Herazo
|Atlético Bucaramanga
|-
| Adrián Ramos
|América de Cali
|-
| rowspan=4 align=center | 9
| Andrés Andrade
|Atlético Nacional
| rowspan=4 align=center | 7
|-
| Ayron del Valle
|Millonarios
|-
| Jorge Luis Ramos
|Santa Fe
|-
| Pablo Sabbag
|La Equidad
|}

Source: Soccerway

Relegation
A separate table is kept to determine the teams that get relegated to the Categoría Primera B for the next season. This table is elaborated from a sum of all first stage games played for the current season and the previous two seasons. For purposes of elaborating the table, promoted teams are given the same point and goal tallies as the team in the 18th position at the start of the season.

Due to the COVID-19 pandemic, no teams were relegated at the end of this season, with relegation being postponed until the end of the first semester of 2021 in order to ensure teams could be able to play the same amount of matches as originally scheduled.

Source: DimayorRules for classification: 1st points; 2nd goal difference; 3rd goals scored; 4th away goals scored.

Awards

Team of the year

See also
 2020 Categoría Primera B season
 2020 Copa Colombia

References

External links 
 Dimayor's official website 

Categoría Primera A seasons
Colombia
1
Colombia